The Automotive industry in Hyderabad was introduced in the year 1930's and manufacturing started with the establishment of Hyderabad Allwyn which use to manufacture auto-components and assemble Albion CX9 buses for Hyderabad State Railways. It was a joint venture of Industrial Development Trust of the Nizam's Hyderabad Government and M/s Allwyn & Company. Following to which Praga Tools was established in 1943 and in post independence of India; HMT bearings in 1963 and Ordnance Factory Medak in 1984 were established.

With the establishment of Tata Boeing Aerospace Limited 2007, Deccan Auto 2011, Mahindra tractor plant 2012 and support of Telangana government had attracted major national and multinational companies such as Hyundai Motor Company, Fiat Chrysler Automobiles and Maruti Suzuki to establish there Research and development, manufacturing, marketing and assembling units in Hyderabad. The latest initiative by Telangana Government to ease and friendly policy for startups had attracted Electric vehicle gaint Triton to start there operations and manufacturing in Hyderabad.

References

Economy of Hyderabad, India
Automotive industry in India